Dunbridge is a hamlet in the Test Valley district of Hampshire, England. It is on the River Dun, a tributary of the River Test.

The Doomsday Book records the manor of Denebrugg being held by one Gilbert de Breteville.

The hamlet is served by Mottisfont & Dunbridge railway station on the Wessex Main Line.

References

Villages in Hampshire
Test Valley